The 1991–92 Czechoslovak Extraliga season was the 49th season of the Czechoslovak Extraliga, the top level of ice hockey in Czechoslovakia. 14 teams participated in the league, and Dukla Trencin won the championship.

Regular season

West Group

East Group

Playoffs

Qualification
 Dukla Jihlava – HC Slovan Bratislava 6:0 (2:0,1:0,3:0)
 Dukla Jihlava – HC Slovan Bratislava 4:2 (1:0,0:1,3:1)
 HC Slovan Bratislava – Dukla Jihlava 1:2 (1:0,0:1,0:1)
 Poldi Kladno – DS Olomouc 5:4 (0:0,2:2,3:2)
 Poldi Kladno – DS Olomouc 2:1 (0:0,2:0,0:1)
 DS Olomouc – Poldi Kladno 4:5 (1:0,2:1,1:4)
 AC ZPS Zlín – Sparta ČKD Prag 2:1 SN (0:1,1:0,0:0,0:0)
 AC ZPS Zlín – Sparta ČKD Prag 4:8 (2:3,2:4,0:1)
 Sparta ČKD Prag – AC ZPS Zlín 4:1 (1:0,1:1,2:0)
 Sparta ČKD Prag – AC ZPS Zlín 4:3 SN (1:1,0:1,2:1,0:0)
 VSŽ Košice – HC Pardubice 3:2 (0:1,1:0,2:1)
 VSŽ Košice – HC Pardubice 4:3 PP (1:1,1:1,1:1,1:0)
 HC Pardubice – VSŽ Košice 6:2 (1:0,5:0,0:2)
 HC Pardubice – VSŽ Košice 2:1 (0:1,1:0,1:0)
 VSŽ Košice – HC Pardubice 5:0 (0:0,2:0,3:0)

Quarterfinal 
Dukla Trenčín – Poldi Kladno 10:4 (4:3,2:0,4:1)
Dukla Trenčín – Poldi Kladno 10:3 (1:0,3:1,6:2)
Poldi Kladno – Dukla Trenčín 3:0 (0:0,2:0,1:0)
Poldi Kladno – Dukla Trenčín 5:2 (1:1,1:1,3:0)
Dukla Trenčín – Poldi Kladno 5:1 (2:1,3:0,0:0)
Vítkovice – Dukla Jihlava 4:6 (1:4,2:2,1:0)
Vítkovice – Dukla Jihlava 6:3 (2:1,3:1,1:1)
Dukla Jihlava – Vítkovice 6:3 (1:1,2:1,3:1)
Dukla Jihlava – Vítkovice 2:6 (0:1,1:4,1:1)
Vítkovice – Dukla Jihlava 6:2 (2:1,3:0,1:1)
HC Škoda Plzeň – HC Sparta Praha 3:2 PP (1:1,1:1,0:0,1:0)
HC Škoda Plzeň – HC Sparta Praha 4:3 (1:1,1:2,2:0)
HC Sparta Praha – HC Škoda Plzeň 4:2 (2:0,2:1,0:1)
HC Sparta Praha – HC Škoda Plzeň 4:1 (2:0,1:1,1:0)
HC Škoda Plzeň – HC Sparta Praha 4:1 (0:1,3:0,1:0)
HC Chemopetrol Litvínov – VSŽ Košice 7:1 (3:0,3:0,1:1)
HC Chemopetrol Litvínov – VSŽ Košice 7:2 (3:1,2:0,2:1)
VSŽ Košice – HC Chemopetrol Litvínov 4:5 (2:0,2:3,0:2)

Semifinal 
HC Škoda Plzeň – Vítkovice 6:3 (2:1,1:2,3:0)
HC Škoda Plzeň – Vítkovice 3:4 SN (1:2,1:0,1:1,0:0)
Vítkovice – HC Škoda Plzeň 8:0 (0:0,5:0,3:0)
Vítkovice – HC Škoda Plzeň 0:3 (0:1,0:2,0:0)
HC Škoda Plzeň – Vítkovice 5:3 (1:0,2:3,2:0)
Dukla Trenčín – HC Chemopetrol Litvínov 3:5 (1:1,2:2,0:2)
Dukla Trenčín – HC Chemopetrol Litvínov 3:1 (0:0,3:0,0:1)
HC Chemopetrol Litvínov – Dukla Trenčín 4:5 PP (2:2,1:1,1:1,0:1)
HC Chemopetrol Litvínov – Dukla Trenčín 5:6 (2:2,0:3,3:1)

Final 
HC Škoda Plzeň – Dukla Trenčín 2:5 (0:2,1:1,1:2)
HC Škoda Plzeň – Dukla Trenčín 4:3 SN (0:1,2:2,1:0,0:0)
Dukla Trenčín – HC Škoda Plzeň 6:4 (3:0,0:2,3:2)
Dukla Trenčín – HC Škoda Plzeň 5:3 (1:1,2:2,2:0)

3rd place 
Vítkovice – HC Chemopetrol Litvínov 2:4 (1:2,1:0,0:2)
HC Chemopetrol Litvínov – Vítkovice 12:5 (4:3,3:0,5:2)

External links
History of Czechoslovak ice hockey

Czechoslovak Extraliga seasons
Czechoslovak
1991–92 in Czechoslovak ice hockey